Internado is a 1935  Argentine musical film directed by Carlos de la Pua and Héctor Basso.

External links

1935 films
1930s Spanish-language films
Argentine black-and-white films
Argentine musical films
1935 musical films
1930s Argentine films